The 1983 World Junior Figure Skating Championships were held on December 14–19, 1982 in Sarajevo, SFR Yugoslavia. Commonly called "World Juniors" and "Junior Worlds", the event determined the World Junior champions in the disciplines of men's singles, ladies' singles, pair skating, and ice dancing.

Results

Men

Ladies

Pairs

Ice dancing

References

1983 in figure skating
1983
International figure skating competitions hosted by Yugoslavia
December 1982 sports events in Europe
1982 in Yugoslav sport
1982 in Bosnia and Herzegovina
Sports competitions in Sarajevo
1983 World Junior Figure Skating Championships